Alfons Dorner (born 1 November 1936) is a German cross-country skier. He competed in the men's 30 kilometre event at the 1964 Winter Olympics.

References

External links
 

1936 births
Living people
German male cross-country skiers
Olympic cross-country skiers of the United Team of Germany
Cross-country skiers at the 1964 Winter Olympics
People from Regen (district)
Sportspeople from Lower Bavaria